Names, is a three-track EP by British indie rock band Johnny Foreigner. It is the first Johnny Foreigner record to feature Lewes Herriot. It was released on longtime home label Alcopop! Records except in the USA where it was released through Chicago-based record label Swerp Records in November 2012. The US version contains an alternative track-listing to Alcopop! release.

Track listing

Personnel
Johnny Foreigner
 Alexei Berrow - Vocals/Guitar
 Kelly Southern - Vocals/Bass
 Lewes Herriot  - Guitar/Vocals
 Junior Elvis Washington Laidley  - Drums/Vocals

References

2012 EPs
Alcopop! Records EPs
Johnny Foreigner albums